Bombelli is an Italian surname. Notable people with the surname include:

Rafael Bombelli (1526–1572), Italian mathematician
Sebastiano Bombelli (1635–1719), Italian painter

See also
Bombelli (crater), a lunar crater

Italian-language surnames